In the United States, a wooden nickel is a wooden token coin, usually issued by a merchant or bank as a promotion, sometimes redeemable for a specific item such as a drink.

Scrip and tokens have often been issued locally in times of severe economic distress such as financial crises and the Civil War. During the Great Depression, after the failure of the Citizens Bank of Tenino in Tenino, Washington, the local Chamber of Commerce teamed up with the local newspaper to issue scrip equivalent to 25% of people's bank deposits that could be spent at local merchants. Blaine, Washington, soon did the same with both flat scrip and, in response to requests generated by news and word of mouth, coins that included a 5-cent piece. The Chicago World's Fair in 1933 issued wooden nickels as souvenirs, and the tradition of wooden nickels as tokens and souvenirs continues to the present day.

In a 21st century twist to Tenino, Washington’s Depression-era use of paper and wooden scrip to aid its citizens, that community is once again issuing wooden scrip to help its citizens and local merchants via its COVID-19 Grant Recovery programme. Upon successful grant application, the grantee can spend the wooden scrip at participating shops in the town. Alternatively, the recipient can use the scrip, or equivalent credit, towards their municipal utility bills.

An American adage, "Don't take any wooden nickels", is considered a lighthearted reminder to be cautious in one's dealings. This adage precedes the use of wooden nickels as a replacement currency, suggesting that its origins lie not in the genuine monetary value of nickels, but rather in their purely commemorative nature.

See also
 Sales tax token
 Slug (coin)

References

Exonumia
Great Depression in the United States
Token coins